Somerset and North Devon was a European Parliament constituency covering all of Somerset in England, plus northern Devon and south-western Avon.  With Cornwall and West Plymouth, it was one of the first two seats to elect a Liberal Democrat Member of the European Parliament.

Prior to its uniform adoption of proportional representation in 1999, the United Kingdom used first-past-the-post for the European elections in England, Scotland and Wales. The European Parliament constituencies used under that system were smaller than the later regional constituencies and only had one Member of the European Parliament each.

It consisted of the Westminster Parliament constituencies (on their 1983 boundaries) of Bridgwater, North Devon, Somerton and Frome, Taunton, Wells, Weston-super-Mare, and Yeovil.

The constituency replaced most of Somerset and West Dorset and parts of Devon.  It became part of the much larger South West England constituency in 1999.

Members of the European Parliament

Results

References

External links
 David Boothroyd's United Kingdom Election Results

European Parliament constituencies in England (1979–1999)
Politics of Somerset
Politics of Devon
1994 establishments in England
1999 disestablishments in England
Constituencies established in 1994
Constituencies disestablished in 1999